Jefferson Township is a township in Greene County, Pennsylvania, United States. The population was 2,359 at the 2020 census, up from 2,352 at the 2010 census.

Geography
Jefferson Township is in northeastern Greene County, bordered at its northeastern end by the Monongahela River, which forms the Fayette County line. The northern border of the township follows Tenmile Creek, a tributary of the Monongahela, and the longer northwestern border of the township follows the South Fork of Tenmile Creek. The borough of Jefferson, a separate municipality, is surrounded by the northwestern part of the township. The borough of Rices Landing borders part of the northeastern edge of the township, and the borough of Clarksville borders the northern edge of the township, across the South Fork of Tenmile Creek. Unincorporated communities in the township include Pitt Gas, Braden Plan, and Dry Tavern.

Demographics

As of the census of 2000, there were 2,528 people, 1,016 households, and 750 families residing in the township.  The population density was 116.8 people per square mile (45.1/km).  There were 1,087 housing units at an average density of 50.2/sq mi (19.4/km).  The racial makeup of the township was 96.24% White, 2.77% African American, 0.32% Native American, 0.28% Asian, and 0.40% from two or more races. Hispanic or Latino of any race were 0.55% of the population.

There were 1,016 households, out of which 27.4% had children under the age of 18 living with them, 61.5% were married couples living together, 9.5% had a female householder with no husband present, and 26.1% were non-families. 22.7% of all households were made up of individuals, and 13.2% had someone living alone who was 65 years of age or older.  The average household size was 2.47 and the average family size was 2.89.

In the township the population was spread out, with 20.3% under the age of 18, 6.6% from 18 to 24, 26.0% from 25 to 44, 27.3% from 45 to 64, and 19.9% who were 65 years of age or older.  The median age was 43 years. For every 100 females, there were 88.7 males.  For every 100 females age 18 and over, there were 88.1 males.

The median income for a household in the township was $31,639, and the median income for a family was $39,565. Males had a median income of $37,700 versus $20,566 for females. The per capita income for the township was $17,143.  About 9.0% of families and 9.3% of the population were below the poverty line, including 10.3% of those under age 18 and 10.3% of those age 65 or over.

Education
The school district is Jefferson-Morgan School District.

References

Townships in Greene County, Pennsylvania
Townships in Pennsylvania